Gharwali Uparwali Aur Sunny (English: My wife ghost of my first wife and sunny) is an Indian fantasy series originally telecast on Star Plus in 2004 and is sequel series of  Gharwali Uparwali which originally aired on Star Plus from 2000 to 2003. The series is created by Nirja Guleri and is directed by Shrey Guleri.

Cast
Mukul Dev as Ravi
Seema Kapoor as "Gharwali" (Pooja)
Shruti Ulfat as "Uparwali" (Chandni)
Mickey Dhamejani as Sunny
Kaivalya Chheda as Monty

References

External links 
 Gharwali Uparwali Aur Sunny at imdb.com

StarPlus original programming
Indian fantasy television series
Indian children's television series
Sequel television series
2003 Indian television series debuts
2004 Indian television series endings